Azoxybenzene is organic compound with the formula C6H5N(O)NC6H5.  It is a yellow, low-melting solid.  The molecule has a planar C2N2O core.  The N-N and N-O bond lengths are nearly the same at 1.23 Å.

Preparation
It can be prepared by partial reduction of nitrobenzene. This reaction is proposed to proceed via the intermediacy of phenylhydroxylamine and nitrosobenzene:
PhNHOH  +  PhNO   →   PhN(O)NPh  +  H2O 

Another option is the oxidation of aniline by hydrogen peroxide, in acetonitrile at 50 ºC. In this reaction, the pH should be kept around 8, to activate the hydrogen peroxide and avoid too much oxygen evolution at the same time. First, the acetonitrile is oxidized, forming an imine hydroperoxide. Then, this intermediate oxidizes the aniline to azoxybenzene.

CH3CN + H2O2 → [CH3C(OOH)=NH]
2 PhNH2 + 3 [CH3C(OOH)=NH] → PhN(O)NPh + 3 CH3C(O)NH2 + 2 H2O
PhNO2 + Na3AsO3/NaOH→ Ph−N+O−=N-Ph

References

 

Phenyl compounds
Azo compounds